Regicides Trail is a Blue-Blazed hiking trail, about 7 miles (11 km) long, roughly following the edge of a diabase, or traprock, cliff northwest of New Haven, Connecticut. It is named for two regicides, Edward Whalley and his son-in-law William Goffe, who signed the death warrant of King Charles I of England. Upon the restoration of Charles II to the throne and the persecution of the regicides, the pair hid in Judges Cave near the south end of the trail in 1660.  The Regicides is widely known to be one of the most technical trails within the CT Blue-Blazed trail system.

Description

The trail is a narrow footpath marked with blue blazes, sometimes rocky with difficult footing. It is roughly paralleled by Baldwin Drive, a paved road currently closed to motor vehicles, except for maintenance vehicles, named for New Haven native Simeon E. Baldwin, governor of Connecticut from 1911 to 1915. The trail is within the towns of New Haven, Hamden, Woodbridge, and Bethany, and entirely within West Rock Ridge State Park, but is maintained by a private organization, the Connecticut Forest and Park Association, in conjunction with the West Rock Ridge Park Association. At its southern end, the Regicides Trail terminates behind a pavilion at the park's South Overlook, which has a panoramic view of South Central, Conn., including Sleeping Giant State Park, East Rock Park, New Haven Harbor, and the Long Island Sound. At its northern end, the Regicides Trail connects with the Quinnipiac Trail.

There are two connecting Blue-Blazed Trails to the Regicides Trail. The Westville Feeder, which starts off Blake Street in the Westville section of New Haven and extends for 0.6 miles, terminating with a junction at the Regicides Trail, just south of Judges Cave. The trail is blazed Blue-Yellow. The Sanford Feeder follows an abandoned town road, running from Brooks Road in Bethany to its junction with the Regicides Trail near Baldwin Drive. The Sanford Feeder is 0.6 miles and is blazed Blue-Red.

The Regicides Trail also connects to a series of other trails within the park that are not part of the Blue-Blazed system. These trails include the Red Trail that creates a trail loop within the park; the Green Trail, connecting down to the park's main entrance on Wintergreen Avenue; the Orange Trail, connecting to the south end of Lake Wintergreen; the Gold Trail, connecting to the northern end of Lake Wintergreen; the Purple Trail, connecting to Main Street in Hamden, and the Yellow Trail, connecting to Mountain Road in Hamden. The Regicides Trail has a connection to the Woodbridge trail system via the red-blazed North Summit Trail, which intersects the Regicides, just west of Baldwin Drive near a U-shaped overlook. The North Summit Trail extends for 0.8 miles and intersects with the Bishop Estate and Darling House Trails, off Connecticut Route 69 in Woodbridge.

See also
List of regicides of Charles I
Metacomet Ridge
West Rock Ridge
West River

References

Further reading

External links
Specific to this trail:
 Official West Rock Ridge State Park website
 West Rock Ridge State Park map
 West Rock Ridge Park Association
 West Rock Nature Center
 Bishop Estate & Darling House Trails
 West Rock Ridge trails information
 CT Museum Quest Article on the Regicides Trail

State and municipal government websites:
 Connecticut Public Act No. 03-131: AN ACT CONCERNING WEST ROCK RIDGE STATE PARK.
 City of New Haven, Connecticut
 Town of Bethany
 Town of Bethany Conservation Commission
 Town of Hamden

Land trust / conservation/preservation organizations:
 West Rock Ridge Park Association
 Bethany Land Trust
 Woodbridge Land Trust
 Connecticut Forest and Park Association
 Regional Water Company website

Blue-Blazed Trails
Metacomet Ridge, Connecticut
Mountains of Connecticut
Protected areas of New Haven County, Connecticut
Geography of New Haven, Connecticut
Hamden, Connecticut
Landforms of New Haven County, Connecticut
Tourist attractions in New Haven, Connecticut